John Van Lieshout (born 1946) is an Australian billionaire, the founder and former owner of the Amart Furniture store chain.

Early life
Born in the Netherlands in 1946, Van Lieshout is one of 13 children of Karel Van Lieshout, a plasterer, and his wife, Anna, who emigrated to Australia in 1960, initially processed at Brisbane's Wacol Migrant Camp.

Van Lieshout has a high school diploma.

Career
Van Lieshout is the founder and former owner of the Super A-Mart furniture store chain. He sold Super A-Mart in 2006 for 500 million, and moved into property development. Through his Unison Projects Group, he has acquired 600 housing blocks and 200 townhouses in the Brisbane area.

Other members of the family have founded businesses, and the family is known in Australia as the "kings and queens of furniture", having founded chains including Empire Office Furniture, Super A-Mart, BW Coles, Chevron and the Woolstore.

Personal life
Van Lieshout is married with three children and lives in Brisbane, Queensland.

Net worth 
In 2014, Queensland's Sunday Mail named Van Lieshout as the richest person in Queensland, by net worth.

References

1946 births
Living people
People from Brisbane
Australian businesspeople
Australian billionaires
Dutch emigrants to Australia